Princess Friederike Luise of Prussia (29 August 1714 – 4 February 1784) was a daughter of Frederick William I of Prussia and Sophia Dorothea of Hanover and Margravine of Brandenburg-Ansbach.

Family

As the sixth child and third daughter of Frederick William I, Friederike Luise was a sister of Frederick II of Prussia, Queen Louisa Ulrika of Sweden, and Philippine Charlotte, Duchess of Brunswick-Wolfenbüttel.

Through her mother, she was a granddaughter of George I of Great Britain, who became King of Britain the year she was born and died when she was 13. This thus made her a niece of George II of Great Britain, who was the king from 1727 to 1760 and died at age 77 when she was 46,and a cousin of Frederick, Prince of Wales, Anne, Princess of Orange, and Queen Louise of Denmark and Norway.

Marriage and children
On 30 May 1729 in Berlin, Friederike Luise married her Hohenzollern kinsman Karl Wilhelm Friedrich, Margrave of Brandenburg-Ansbach (12 May 1712 – 3 August 1757).  They had two children :

 Charles Frederick Augustus (7 April 1733 – 9 May 1737)
 Charles Alexander, Margrave of Brandenburg-Ansbach (24 February 1736 – 5 January 1806). Married firstly Princess Frederica Caroline of Saxe-Coburg-Saalfeld, and after her death, Lady Elizabeth Craven.

Biography 

After the death of her older sister Charlotte Albertine (1713–1714), she was given special consideration and was allowed to grow up as she pleased. Her sister Wilhelmine of Bayreuth describes her in her memoirs as possessing a "capricious and petty nature". However, she also praised her talent and  beauty.

Her marriage was arranged by her mother-in-law, the regent of Ansbach, and her father, who wished to gain influence in Ansbach.
Her brother, King Frederick II, extended her appanage and received in return a regiment of soldiers from Ansbach.

The marriage was not happy; her spouse Karl Wilhelm Friedrich was known as "The wild margrave". He even remarked to King Friedrich Wilhelm I of Prussia that he had cheated by the marriage. Even on the trip to Ansbach in June 1729 for her wedding, Luise Friederike was suffering from symptoms of the metabolic disease porphyria. She suffered from nausea, vomiting and faintings during which she was "dead as it seemed". Her spouse claimed she was lame and had bad teeth. Initially, he would not sleep with her. Crown Prince Frederick of Prussia commented on the marriage in February 1732 in these terms: "My sister and her husband the Ansbacher hate each other like fire." (»... ma soeur d'Anspac et son mari qui se Mr. haïssent comme le feu. ") At a window in the family room of the Ansbacher Residenz, she scratched this plea with a diamond in the glass:" Je souffre sans oser le dire. " (I suffer without daring to say it.)

At the birth of her son, Friederike Louise was given Hofmark Unterschwaningen as a residence. However, the Hereditary Prince Carl Friedrich August died on 9 May 1737. The Margrave and the whole court blamed Friederike Louise for his death. She separated from her spouse and lived more and more in the seclusion of Unterschwaningen, which she expanded artistically. Friederike Louise did not return to Ansbach until she became a widow in 1757. Her unhappiness was further compounded by the refusal of her surviving son to see or acknowledge her.

Ancestry

References

External links

|-

1714 births
1784 deaths
House of Hohenzollern
People from Berlin
18th-century German people
Prussian princesses
Margravines of Brandenburg-Ansbach
Daughters of kings